Raozan,gohira is an upazila of Chattogram District, in Chattogram Division, Bangladesh. It was established in 1947.

Geography
Raozan has 45,777 households and a total area of 246.58 km2.

The two main rivers are Karnaphuli and Halda.

Raozan is surrounded by Fatikchhari Upazila on the north, Boalkhali Upazila and Karnafuli river on the south, Rangunia and Kawkhali (Rangamati) Upazilas on the east, and Hathazari and Fatikchhari Upazila on the west.

The river Karnaphuli flows on the south side of the Raozan Upazila and the river Halda flows on the west side.

Demographics
According to the 1991 Bangladesh census, Raozan had a population of 274,344. Males constituted 50.58% of the population, while females constituted about 49.42% of the population. The average literacy rate is 52.5% (7+ years), above the national average of 32.4%.

According to the 2011 figures, the total population of Raozan Upazila is 3,25,389. Males: 1,63,963 female: 1,61,426 Muslims, 75% of the total population. 18% Hindus, 6% Buddhists and 1% other religions. Indigenous communities like Marma, Tripura, Mogh are living in this Upazila.

Administration

Raozan Upazila is divided into Raozan Municipality and 14 union parishads: Bagoan, Binajuri, Chikdair, Dabua, Gahira, Haladia, Kadalpur, Noajispur, Noapara, Pahartali, Paschim Guzara, Purba Guzara, Raozan, and Urkirchar. The union parishads are subdivided into 64 mauzas and 66 villages.

Raozan Municipality is subdivided into 9 wards and 17 mahallas.

Health centres

Raozan has two health complexes, and some private hospitals.

Education

The upazila has three universities, three graduate colleges, three higher secondary colleges, four schools and colleges, two kamil madrashas, four fazil madrashas, four alim madrashas, 12 dakhil madrashas, five MPo dakhil madrashas, 48 secondary schools (student), three girls' secondary schools, nine lower secondary schools, 177 government primary schools and community schools and kindergartens.

Universities
 Chittagong University of Engineering & Technology (CUET)

Colleges
 Raozan Government College
 Gohira Degree College

Notable residents
 A. B. M. Fazle Karim Chowdhury, Member of Parliament for constituency Chittagong-6 2001–2006 and for Chittagong-5 from 2009 to 2014, and MP for Chittagong-6 again since 2014
 A. B. M. Mohiuddin Chowdhury, mayor of Chittagong (1994–2010), born at Gohira village in 1944 
 Abdul Haq Choudhury, writer, researcher, Ekushey Padak laureate, born in Raozan in 1922
 Abdullah Al Noman, former Minister of Fisheries 
 Benimadhab Barua, scholar of ancient Indian languages, Buddhism and law, born at Mahamuni village in 1888
 Ambika Chakrabarty
 Fazlul Qadir Chaudhry, Speaker of the Pakistan National Assembly (1963–1965), born at Gohira village in 1919
 Giasuddin Quader Chowdhury, former Member of Parliament 
 Mahbub Ul Alam Choudhury, writer, born at Gohira village in 1927
 Nabinchandra Sen, poet, born at Noapara village in 1847
 Nutan Chandra Singha, businessman, born at Gohira village in 1990
Shahid Mahmud Jangi, renowned lyricist, writer and an art collector. He was the founding convener and later was elected as the first president of Bangladesh lyricist association.
 Salahuddin Quader Chowdhury, executed war criminal and Member of Parliament, born at Gohira village in 1949
 Shabana, film actress 
 Sukumar Barua, poet 
 Surya Sen, anti-British revolutionary, born at Noapara village in 1894
 Syed Wahidul Alam, Member of Parliament for constituency Chittagong-5 1991–2006
 Ziauddin Ahmed Bablu, Jatiya Party Member of Parliament 
 Daulat Qazi, poet

See also
 Upazilas of Bangladesh
 Districts of Bangladesh
 Divisions of Bangladesh

References

Upazilas of Chittagong District
1947 establishments in East Pakistan